Brendon Timoni (born 11 June 1995) is a Zimbabwean cricketer. He made his first-class debut for Mashonaland Eagles in the 2016–17 Logan Cup on 6 May 2017. He made his List A debut for Mashonaland Eagles in the 2017–18 Pro50 Championship on 30 April 2018. In December 2020, he was selected to play for the Eagles in the 2020–21 Logan Cup.

References

External links
 

1995 births
Living people
Zimbabwean cricketers
Mashonaland Eagles cricketers
Sportspeople from Harare